La grotta di Trofonio (Trofonio's Cave) is an opera, described as an opera comica, in two acts (five scenes) composed by Antonio Salieri to an Italian libretto by Giovanni Battista Casti.

The work was first performed in Vienna at the Burgtheater on 12 October 1785. The similarity of the story of the opera may have influenced Lorenzo da Ponte when he wrote the libretto of Mozart's Così fan tutte.

Roles

Synopsis
Dori and Ofelia (sisters) are in love with Plistene and Artemidoro (friends). The two pairs have contrasting personalities: Dori and Plistene are extroverted and enthusiastic, Ofelia and Artemidoro are introverted and reserved. The magician Trofonio invites them to his magic cave where their characters are reversed, first the men and then the women. Eventually everything is sorted out and there is a happy ending.

Recordings
Les Talens Lyriques and Lausanne Opera Chorus
 Conductor: Christophe Rousset 
 Principal singers: Olivier Lallouette, Raffaella Milanesi, Marie Arnet, Nikolai Schukoff, Mario Cassi
 Recording date: (published 2005)
 Label: Ambroisie AMB 9986

References

Literature

 Rice, John A (1992), 'Grotta di Trofonio, La' in The New Grove Dictionary of Opera, ed. Stanley Sadie (London) 

Opera buffa
Operas by Antonio Salieri
Opera world premieres at the Burgtheater
Operas